Mohylów may refer to:
Mogilev, a city in eastern Belarus,
Mohyliv-Podilskyi, a city in the Ukraine